Ouango is a town located in the Central African Republic prefecture of Bangui.

References

Populated places in the Central African Republic
Bangui